Montanino Nuvoli (2 January 1931 – 4 October 1997) was an Italian rower. He competed in the men's eight event at the 1952 Summer Olympics.

References

External links
 

1931 births
1997 deaths
Italian male rowers
Olympic rowers of Italy
Rowers at the 1952 Summer Olympics
Place of birth missing